"I Don't Want a Lover" is the debut single of Scottish band Texas, taken from their first album, Southside (1989). The music starts with blues slide guitar followed by a throbbing rhythm section before the vocals break in. It was released on 23 January 1989 and peaked at number eight on the UK Singles Chart.

In 2001, Norwegian production team Stargate remixed and re-released the song to promote The Greatest Hits compilation album. Released on 9 July 2001, this version peaked at number 16 on the UK chart.

Critical reception
In an ironic review of 4 February 1989 the Phil Cheeseman, reviewer of British music newspaper Record Mirror, chided the song for lack of individuality. He wrote: "It Begins brightly with some welcome slide guitar work but even before its slide towards American FM rock you're already scouring the sleeve in a vague attempt to find something, anything of interest".

Track listings

Original release
7-inch, mini-CD, and cassette single
A. "I Don't Want a Lover"
B. "Believe Me"

CD and 12-inch single
 "I Don't Want a Lover" (full version)
 "Believe Me"
 "All in Vain"

2001 mix

UK CD1
 "I Don't Want a Lover" – 4:15
 "Superwrong" – 3:58
 "I Don't Want a Lover" (Stonebridge club remix) – 7:37
 "I Don't Want a Lover" (video)

UK CD2
 "I Don't Want a Lover" (live)
 "Summer Son" (live)
 "Suspicious Minds" (live)
 All songs were recorded live at the Greatest Hits tour 2001

UK cassette single
 "I Don't Want a Lover" – 4:15
 "Summer Son" (live) – 4:16
 "I Don't Want a Lover" (Trailermen remix) – 4:43

European CD single
 "I Don't Want a Lover" (2001 mix) – 4:15
 "Superwrong" – 3:58

European maxi-CD single
 "I Don't Want a Lover" (2001 mix) – 4:15
 "Superwrong" – 3:58
 "Suspicious Minds" (live in Paris, 2001) – 5:03
 "I Don't Want a Lover" (Stonebridge bed mix) – 7:37

Personnel
Personnel are lifted from The Greatest Hits album booklet and the 2001 UK CD1 liner notes.

 Johnny McElhone – writing, bass
 Sharleen Spiteri – writing, backing vocals, guitars
 Stuart Kerr – backing vocals, drums
 Ally McErlaine – guitars
 Giuliano Gizzi – guitars
 Craig Armstrong – keyboards
 Wix – keyboards
 Mark Feltham – harmonica
 Tim Palmer – production
 Simon Vinestock – engineering
 Stargate – remix, additional production (2001 mix)

Charts

Weekly charts
Original version

2001 mix

Year-end charts

Certifications

Release history

References

1989 debut singles
1989 songs
2001 singles
Mercury Records singles
Phonogram Records singles
Songs written by Johnny McElhone
Songs written by Sharleen Spiteri
Texas (band) songs